Home with Kids  (pinyin: Jiā yǒu érnǚ, literally Home with Sons and Daughters), is a sitcom/drama from Mainland China. There are 4 seasons of Home with Kids, i.e. Home with Kids 1, Home with Kids 2, Home with Kids 3 and Home with Kids 4, which were released respectively in 2004, 2005, 2006 and 2007. It is considered to be an equivalent to Growing Pains and Fresh Off The Boat, both a US sitcom. Unlike most Chinese multi-camera sitcoms, Home With Kids prominently uses child actors as main roles. As a spiritual successor of China's first multi-camera sitcom, I Love My Family, the series also reunites Song Dandan and Wen Xingyu. (Also one of Wen's final roles before his death)

The series has ended with 365 half-hour episodes.

Premise
Xia Donghai, a director of children's drama who has divorced, returns from the U.S. with his young son Xia Yu (commonly known as "Xiǎo Yǔ") and daughter Xia Xue (also known as "Xiǎo Xuě") to start a family with a divorced woman Liu Mei, who has a son, Liu Xing, from her previous marriage. The five live happily in a flat in modern Beijing. The story is evolved around the family member's encounters to various issues in life and their attempts to cope/solve them, and most episodes involve the parents' attempts to act as a good example for their children and teach them know right from wrong. This family arrangement is atypical for modern Chinese families because of the one child per family policy.

Characters

Main characters

The Xia Family
Xia Donghai (夏东海), portrayed by Gao Yalin, is the bespectacled father of Xia Xue and Xia Yu and stepfather of Liu Xing. As a director of children's drama, he is portrayed with a child-friendly personality of being kind, generous, humorous, and easygoing. As someone who has witnessed American education, his ways with the children involves mainly tolerance, understanding and signs of equality. He can also be quite lazy and incompetent at housework or sports. In the second season, he is fired from the spot of director and is recruited as the editor of a children's magazine.

Liu Mei (刘梅), portrayed by Song Dandan, is the mother of Liu Xing and stepmother of Xia Yu and Xia Xue. She is a director of nurses at a hospital and is in charge of the household. Being an adopter of more "traditional" ways of education, she often demonstrates a strong preference to Xia Xue, due to her outstanding school marks and many talents; she often attempts to inflict corporal punishment on her misbehaving children (in particular her own son Liu Xing), but for the most part fails to do so. She is portrayed with a somewhat strong curiosity and slight overzealousness. Moreover, she constantly attempts to understand the three children and help them in any way possible.

Xia Xue (夏雪), portrayed by Andy Yang (in the first two seasons) and Ning Danlin (in the latter two seasons), is the elder daughter of Xia Donghai. She is a typical "smart girl" with excellent grades. She is confident, but also somewhat slightly arrogant, and is often the creator of the more "advanced" issues for her parents. In the first episodes, she distrusts her new stepmother and even tried to "scare her" by "developing" a trend for "puppy love" (which is strongly intolerated by the more "traditional" Chinese parents), but soon finds her very trustworthy. In the third season, she is depressed for not making the marks for Tsinghua University, but soon overcomes her depression.

Liu Xing (刘星), portrayed by Zhang Yishan, is the son of Liu Mei. He is a rather poor student (especially at chemistry), but is quite witty and tactful. The resident troublemaker of the home, he receives most of the blame from his parents. Apart from that, he is sporty (both athletic and acrobatic), chivalrous, and always filled with ideas and advice for others (both good and bad).

Xia Yu (夏雨), portrayed by You Haoran, is the younger son of Xia Donghai. Being raised in America, he is capable of speaking good English (but prefers not to when he moved to Beijing) and has knowledge of many American customs. However, this knowledge is often countered in the episodes by his cluelessness over the usage of some Chinese language features (in particular set phrases and idioms) and Chinese traditions. He follows his stepbrother Liu Xing in his exploits, and will often be the potential troublemaker after Liu Xing. As a running gag, he often proudly announces himself as "the handsome little oversea-Chinese" when meeting strangers.

Secondary characters
Grandpa or Yeye, portrayed by Wen Xingyu (文兴宇), is Xia Donghai's father. He is interested in things that are for the common good, like saving electricity and saving water. He is a retired sports coach and is often very strict. Grandma calls him a fascist. Named Xia Xiang.

Grandma or Laolao, portrayed by Sun Guitian (孙桂田), is Liu Mei's mother. She pampers and spoils her grandchildren and spare them from any hardships and inconveniences. She dislikes Grandpa; she always seeks to quarrel with him.

Hu Yitong (胡一统), portrayed by Ma Shuliang (马书良), is Liu Xing's hapless biological father. He often drops by unannounced, to the consternation of his ex-wife Liu Mei.

Mary or Mǎlì (玛丽), portrayed by Hei Mei (戚慧) (seasons 1–2) and Fu Yujia (傅羽佳) (season 4), is the biological mother of Xia Xue and Xia Yu. She likes to spoil them and blames Xia Donghai and Liu Mei whenever the children are upset. It is implied that she is wealthy, as she owns a BMW and carries around expensive purses.

Feifei (菲菲), portrayed by Ran Qian (冉倩), is Xia Donghai's cousin.

Shubiao "Mouse" (鼠标), portrayed by Zhang Yiwen, is Liu Xing's good friend. His parents are especially strict. His real name is Lin Ning (林宁)

Jianpan "Keyboard" (键盘), portrayed by Sheng Guansen (盛冠森; season 1) and Sky Sheng (盛超; season 2), is Liu Xing's other good friend. Named Sheng Chao.

Duoduo (朵朵), portrayed by Duan Liyang (段丽阳), is Xia Yu's close friend.

"Erpang" (二胖), portrayed by Zhai Zhenjing, is Xia Yu's friend. His father is called in the screenplay Laogao (老高)

Other characters

Production

External links 
 

2005 Chinese television series debuts
2008 Chinese television series endings
Television shows set in Beijing
Chinese television sitcoms
Mandarin-language television shows